The Colombian soft-furred spiny-rat (Diplomys caniceps), or arboreal soft-furred spiny-rat, is a species of rodent in the family Echimyidae.
It is found in Colombia and Ecuador.
Its natural habitat is subtropical or tropical moist lowland forests.

References

Diplomys
Mammals of Colombia
Mammals of Ecuador
Mammals described in 1877
Taxa named by Albert Günther
Taxonomy articles created by Polbot